Michael Airfield  is a public airport located on 34 acres just northwest of the central business district of Cicero, New York, United States. The airport is privately owned but open to public flight operations.

Facilities and background 
CLOSED BY FAA NYADO AUGUST 2009. PUBLIC USE OPERATIONS TO BE TAKEN OVER BY SYRACUSE SUBURBAN 6NK AFTER RECONSTRUCTION. According to the Federal Aviation Administration's airport master record for Michael Airfield, issued following a September 27, 2006 inspection, runway markings for 10/28 were very faded and the field was unattended. The airport, which sits beneath Syracuse Hancock International Airport's Class C airspace, was established in December 1944. In the 1990s, the little used airport was unable to cover its taxes and put up for sale for US$500,000. 

The airport, now owned by David Pizio, was listed in the third addition of John Purner's book The $100 Hamburger: A Guide to Pilots' Favorite Fly-in Restaurants. A $100 Hamburger is aviation slang referring to a meal eaten at an airport or nearby restaurant following a general aviation flight made by a pilot who, looking for an excuse to fly, decides to eat at a non-local airport.

See also
 List of airports in New York

References

External links 
 

Defunct airports in New York (state)
Airports in New York (state)